Sinopoda scurion is a species of huntsman spider discovered in 2012 in a Laotian cave. It is the first recorded huntsman spider to lack eyes. Due to its dark cave habitat, it has no requirement of vision for hunting.

Discovery and naming
Sinopoda scurion was found in a cave in Laos, around 100 km away from the Xe Bang Fai cave.

The eyeless huntsman spider was named after the Swiss company Scurion that makes headlamps for cavers.

References

Cave spiders
Spiders of Asia
Arthropods of Laos
Endemic fauna of Laos
Spiders described in 2012